Y Bandana is the self-titled debut studio album of the Welsh language alternative rock band Y Bandana, released in the United Kingdom on 31 January 2011.

Track listing

Dal dy Drwyn/Cân y Tân

"Dal dy Drwyn" and "Cân y Tân" were released on 2 August 2010 as a double A-side single before being included on the album Y Bandana.  The songs have received generally favourable reviews from critics. The song "Dal dy Drwyn" has been noted for its humorous lyrics and catchy melody as it "bemoans the smell of another with Arctic Monkeys precision", and the nature of the song is evident in its title, which translates into English as "hold your nose". The band achieved an award for the best single in Welsh language magazine Y Selar in 2010, while the song "Cân y Tân" won the award for best song in the same year.

Track listing

References

2011 albums
Welsh-language albums